The Kurdistan Democratic Party (KDP; , abbreviated HDK) is an ethnic party of Kurds in Iran, which split from Democratic Party of Iranian Kurdistan (KDPI) in 2006 after a dispute over choosing its next leader in the latter's 13th convention. The KDPI and Iran’s Kurdistan Democratic Party (KDP-Iran) have been engaged in several rounds of reunification talks over the years. On August 21, 2022, the two parties announced that they would finally reunite.

The first time in 2016, Iranian agents had planted a bomb outside the party headquarters that killed and injured several members. The second time was in 2018 when the Iranian regime attacked the KDP-I party headquarters with ballistic missilier from Iran to Iraqi Kurdistan where the party headquarters is located.

The party was made a full member of the Socialist International at its November 2015 Council meeting in Luanda, Angola.

Secretaries-General
Khalid Azizi (2008–2017)
Mostafa Moloudi (2017–2019)
Khalid Azizi (2019–)

References

External links
Kurdistan Democratic Party website

2006 establishments in Iran
Banned political parties in Iran
Banned Kurdish parties
Banned socialist parties
Full member parties of the Socialist International
Kurdish nationalism in Iran
Kurdish nationalist political parties
Kurdish political parties in Iran
Political parties established in 2006
Rebel groups in Iran
Secularism in Iran
Socialist parties in Iran